Bolshevik is the name of several inhabited localities in Russia.

Urban localities
Bolshevik, Magadan Oblast, an urban-type settlement in Susumansky District of Magadan Oblast

Rural localities
Bolshevik, Altai Krai, a settlement in Pospelikhinsky Selsoviet of Pospelikhinsky District of Altai Krai
Bolshevik, Bryansky District, Bryansk Oblast, a settlement in Chernetovsky Selsoviet of Bryansky District of Bryansk Oblast
Bolshevik, Rognedinsky District, Bryansk Oblast, a settlement in Tyuninsky Selsoviet of Rognedinsky District of Bryansk Oblast
Bolshevik, Chelyabinsk Oblast, a settlement in Novouralsky Selsoviet of Varnensky District of Chelyabinsk Oblast
Bolshevik, Kaluga Oblast, a selo in Sukhinichsky District of Kaluga Oblast
Bolshevik, Karachay-Cherkess Republic, a khutor in Urupsky District of the Karachay-Cherkess Republic
Bolshevik, Kirov Oblast, a settlement in Bolshevistsky Rural Okrug of Sunsky District of Kirov Oblast
Bolshevik, Novokubansky District, Krasnodar Krai, a khutor in Verkhnekubansky Rural Okrug of Novokubansky District of Krasnodar Krai
Bolshevik, Tikhoretsky District, Krasnodar Krai, a settlement in Yugo-Severny Rural Okrug of Tikhoretsky District of Krasnodar Krai
Bolshevik, Timashyovsky District, Krasnodar Krai, a khutor in Medvedovsky Rural Okrug of Timashyovsky District of Krasnodar Krai
Bolshevik, Yeysky District, Krasnodar Krai, a settlement in Trudovoy Rural Okrug of Yeysky District of Krasnodar Krai
Bolshevik, Republic of Mordovia, a settlement in Starosindrovsky Selsoviet of Krasnoslobodsky District of the Republic of Mordovia
Bolshevik, Moscow Oblast, a settlement in Kalinovskoye Rural Settlement of Serpukhovsky District of Moscow Oblast
Bolshevik, Nizhny Novgorod Oblast, a settlement in Novoslobodsky Selsoviet of Bolsheboldinsky District of Nizhny Novgorod Oblast
Bolshevik, Orenburg Oblast, a selo in Uralsky Selsoviet of Kvarkensky District of Orenburg Oblast
Bolshevik, Orlovsky District, Oryol Oblast, a settlement in Zhilyayevsky Selsoviet of Orlovsky District of Oryol Oblast
Bolshevik, Uritsky District, Oryol Oblast, a settlement in Kotovsky Selsoviet of Uritsky District of Oryol Oblast
Bolshevik, Azovsky District, Rostov Oblast, a khutor in Kalinovskoye Rural Settlement of Azovsky District of Rostov Oblast
Bolshevik, Orlovsky District, Rostov Oblast, a khutor in Ostrovyanskoye Rural Settlement of Orlovsky District of Rostov Oblast
Bolshevik, Blagodarnensky District, Stavropol Krai, a khutor in Blagodarnensky District, Stavropol Krai
Bolshevik, Ipatovsky District, Stavropol Krai, a settlement in Bolshevistsky Selsoviet of Ipatovsky District of Stavropol Krai
Bolshevik, Vladimir Oblast, a settlement in Kolchuginsky District of Vladimir Oblast
Bolshevik, Alexeyevsky District, Volgograd Oblast, a khutor in Krasnooktyabrsky Selsoviet of Alexeyevsky District of Volgograd Oblast
Bolshevik, Yelansky District, Volgograd Oblast, a settlement in Bolshevistsky Selsoviet of Yelansky District of Volgograd Oblast
Bolshevik, Voronezh Oblast, a settlement under the administrative jurisdiction of Novokhopyorsk Urban Settlement in Novokhopyorsky District of Voronezh Oblast
Bolshevik, Zabaykalsky Krai, a selo in Ononsky District of Zabaykalsky Krai